KLAM (1450 AM, "The Clam") is a radio station licensed to serve Cordova, Alaska.  The station is owned by Bayview Communications, Inc.  It airs a Classic rock/Country music and Talk radio format.

The station has been assigned these call letters by the Federal Communications Commission since 1954.

In the movie Stand By Me, KLAM is featured as a fictional radio station from Portland, Oregon.

References

External links
FCC History Cards for KLAM
 
 
 
 

1954 establishments in Alaska
Buildings and structures in Chugach Census Area, Alaska
Classic rock radio stations in the United States
Cordova, Alaska
Country radio stations in the United States
Radio stations established in 1954
LAM
Talk radio stations in the United States